Roberto Ghiglianovich (17 July 1863 – 2 September 1930) was an Italian politician.

Biography
He was grown up in a liberal family in Zara, Austria-Hungary (today Zadar, Croatia). As a child, two of his greatest friends were the Croat Petar Klaić and the Serb Dušan Baljak. Their friendship was so strong that it made him want to learn the Serbo-Croatian language.

He studied law in Graz and Vienna. During his time in Austria, and with the influence of other Dalmatian Italians from the province irredente, he started to develop nationalistic feelings. Upon his return to Zadar, as a lawyer, he began to endeavor in politics ever more.

Although he was open to make some concessions to the Slavs, Ghiglianovich endeavored to get at least Zara annexed to Italy. He endeavored against the "process of discrimination actuated by the municipalities in Croatian hands," thus attempting to preserve the Italian language in schools and in the public administration.

Upon Italy's entry in World War I, he escaped from Austria to Rome, where he was chosen, at the end of the war, member of the Italian delegation to the Paris Peace Conference (1919–1920), as an aggregate in the marine section, as a legal expert for Dalmatia.

Ghiglianovich, who became judge at the Supreme Court of Cassation, was then nominated Senator of the Kingdom of Italy on November 15, 1920.

In the 1920s, he got sick and retired in his hometown Zara (present-day Zadar). He died in Gorizia on September 2, 1930.

References

External links 
Italian Senate Page

Sources
 O. Randi, Il senatore R. Ghiglianovich. Profilo aneddotico, in Rivista dalmatica, XII (1930), 1, pp. 3–27
 R. Montini, Lettere inedite di F. Venezian e di R. G. sulla difesa dell'italianità giuliana e dalmata, in Rass. stor. del Risorgimento, XXXVIII (1951), 3–4, pp. 509–522 
 R. Monteleone, La politica dei fuoriusciti irredenti nella Guerra Mondiale, Udine 1972

Bibliography
 L.Monzali, Italiani di Dalmazia. Dal Risorgimento alla Grande Guerra, Le Lettere, Firenze 2004
 L.Monzali, Italiani di Dalmazia. 1914-1924, Le Lettere, Firenze 2007
 D.Salghetti Drioli, Roberto Ghiglianovich, in F.Semi-V.Tacconi (cur.), Istria e Dalmazia. Uomini e tempi. Dalmazia, Del Bianco, Udine 1992

1864 births
1930 deaths
Dalmatian Italians
Politicians from Zadar
Members of the Senate of the Republic (Italy)
Members of the Senate of the Kingdom of Italy